The 2nd Central Auditing Committee (CAC) of the Workers' Party of Korea (WPK), officially the Central Auditing Committee of the 2nd Congress of the Workers' Party of Korea, was elected by the 2nd Congress on 30 March 1948.

Members

References

Citations

Bibliography
Books:
 
 
  

Dissertations:
 

2nd Central Auditing Committee of the Workers' Party of Korea
1948 establishments in North Korea
1956 disestablishments in North Korea